The Lexington Marathon Oilers, or Lexington Marathon Oil, was a professional basketball team. They were a part of the National Alliance of Basketball Leagues.

History
The Oilers competed at the 1973 edition, and 1984 edition of the Intercontinental Cup.

References

Defunct basketball teams in the United States